al-Ismāʿīliyya al-khāliṣa / al-Ismāʿīliyya al-wāqifa or Seveners was a branch of Ismā'īlī Shīʻa. They broke off from the more numerous Twelvers after the death of Jafar al-Sadiq in 765 AD. They became known as "Seveners" because they believed that Isma'il ibn Ja'far was the seventh and last Imam (hereditary leader of the Muslim community in the direct line of Ali). They believed his son, Muhammad ibn Isma'il, would return and bring about an age of justice as Mahdi. Their most well-known and active branch were the Qarmatians.

History, Shia schisms, and Seveners

Seveners and the Fatimid dynasty

List of Imams 

Sometimes "Sevener" is used to refer to Ismā'īlīs overall, though mainstream Musta'li and Nizari Isma'ilis have far more than seven imams.

Ismaili imams who were not accepted as legitimate by Seveners
The following Ismaili imams after Mahdi had been considered as heretics of dubious origins by certain Qarmatian groups who refused to acknowledge the imamate of the Fatimids and clung to their belief in the coming of the Mahdi.

 Abadullah ibn Muhammad (Ahmad al-Wafi) (813-829)
 Ahmad ibn Abadullah (Muhammad at-Taqi) (829-840)
 Husayn ibn Ahmad (Radi Abdullah) (840-881)
 Abdallah al-Mahdi Billah (881-934) (Founder of Fatimid Caliphate)

See also
List of extinct Shia sects
Isma'ilism

References

Ismailism
Extinct Islamic sects